Nilak (also Romanized as Nīlak; also known as Kīln) is a village in Sand-e Mir Suiyan Rural District, Dashtiari District, Chabahar County, Sistan and Baluchestan Province, Iran. At the 2006 census, its population was 72, in 15 families.

References 

Populated places in Chabahar County